Luna Park Historic District is a federally designated national historic district located in the West Side neighborhood of Charleston, Kanawha County, West Virginia. It encompasses 444 contributing buildings in a predominantly residential section of Charleston. The majority of the homes in the district were constructed in the mid to late 1925s and early 1930s and a portion of the district was the location of a local amusement park, Luna Park, from 1912 until 1923. The houses reflect a variety of popular architectural styles including American Foursquare, American Craftsman / Bungalow, Tudor Revival, and Colonial Revival, including Dutch Colonial Revival.

It was listed on the National Register of Historic Places in 2012.

References

Houses on the National Register of Historic Places in West Virginia
Houses in Charleston, West Virginia
Historic districts in Charleston, West Virginia
Historic districts on the National Register of Historic Places in West Virginia
National Register of Historic Places in Charleston, West Virginia